Half Moon Street is a 1986 British-American erotic thriller film directed by Bob Swaim and starring Sigourney Weaver, Michael Caine, Keith Buckley, and P. J. Kavanagh. The film is about an American woman working at a British escort service who becomes involved in the political intrigues surrounding one of her clients.

Half Moon Street was the first RKO Pictures solo feature film produced in almost a quarter-century. The previous one was Jet Pilot, made in 1957.

The film was based on the 1984 novel Doctor Slaughter by Paul Theroux.  Despite the source material, the film and book have distinct endings.

Plot
Dr Lauren Slaughter is an American academic living in London, where she holds a prestigious but low-paid position at a Middle East policy institute. Her superiors take credit for her work and she struggles to pay the rent on her dilapidated flat.

After an anonymous individual mails her a video tape promoting the financial rewards of prostitution, Slaughter signs up with the high-end Jasmine Agency and begins moonlighting as a paid escort to rich men. These include a Palestinian businessman called Karim, who gifts her his apartment on Half Moon Street, and Lord Bulbeck, a trusted member of the House of Lords with a key role in diplomacy and national defence.

Slaughter and Bulbeck strike up a relationship that goes beyond sex, each enjoying the other's conversation and intelligence. However, Bulbeck's work on a delicate Middle East peace process forces him to miss a series of dates, causing Slaughter to feel rejected.

Slaughter briefly takes up with a playboy called Sonny, who later shows up at her apartment. He attacks her and threatens her with a gun, but she tricks and kills him. Karim arrives and also holds her at gunpoint, revealing that he was the one who sent her the video tape. Karim and Sonny are part of a conspiracy to destroy the peace process by murdering Bulbeck while he is with a prostitute, thus killing both the man and his reputation. A special forces team storms the apartment and kills Karim. Slaughter and Bulbeck rekindle their romance.

Cast

References

External links
 
 
 

1980s thriller drama films
1986 films
Films shot at EMI-Elstree Studios
1980s erotic thriller films
Films directed by Bob Swaim
American thriller drama films
British thriller drama films
Films set in London
Films based on American novels
Films about prostitution in the United Kingdom
RKO Pictures films
Films scored by Richard Harvey
1986 drama films
Paul Theroux
1980s English-language films
1980s American films
1980s British films